Mequitazine (trade name Primalan) is an H1 antagonist and anticholinergic of the phenothiazine chemical class. It is used to treat allergies and rhinitis.

It was patented in 1969 and came into medical use in 1976.

Contraindications
Severe liver disease; premature infants or full-term neonates.

Special precautions
Pregnancy, lactation; severe cardiovascular disorders; asthma; angle-closure glaucoma, urinary retention, prostatic hyperplasia, pyloroduodenal obstruction; renal and hepatic impairment; elderly, children; epilepsy. May impair ability to drive or operate machinery.

Adverse reactions
CNS depression including slight drowsiness to deep sleep, lassitude, dizziness, incoordination. Headache, psychomotor impairment and antimuscarinic effects. Rarely, rashes and hypersensitivity reactions, blood disorders, convulsions, sweating, myalgia, paraesthesias, extrapyramidal effects, tremor, confusion, sleep and GI disturbances, tinnitus, hypotension, hair loss. Photosensitivity, jaundice.

Drug interactions
Enhances effects of CNS depressants e.g. alcohol, barbiturates, hypnotics, opioid analgesics, anxiolytics and antipsychotics. Can mask signs of ototoxicity caused by aminoglycosides. QT prolongation (which can lead to torsades de pointes arrhythmia) reported with spiramycin.

Synthesis
Same precursor as for Quifenadine. Note that the synthesis has changed over the years from the original. One route seems to involve a Johnson–Corey–Chaykovsky reaction of the starting ketone, although another secondary route is also discussed.

References

Further reading

External links 
 

H1 receptor antagonists
Muscarinic antagonists
Phenothiazines
Quinuclidines